(15 November 1948 – 7 September 2011 in Tokyo) was a Japanese badminton player. She won numerous major international titles from the late 1960s to the late 1970s.

Career 
Yuki was among the most notable of a cadre of fine players who helped Japan to win five of the six Uber Cup (women's world team) competitions held between 1966 and 1981. With the possible exception of Etsuko Toganoo she was Japan's most successful ever player at the prestigious All-England Championships winning four singles titles (1969, 1974, 1975, 1977) there, as well as a doubles title (1971) in partnership with her friendly rival Noriko Takagi. At the 1972 Olympics, she won a bronze medal in Women's singles, when badminton was played as a demonstration sport. In the latter part of her career she earned a women's singles bronze medal at the first IBF World Championships in 1977. Yuki overcame an Achilles tendon rupture early in her career to compile her impressive record.

Achievements

Olympic Games (demonstration)

World Championships

World Cup

Asian Games

International tournaments

Invitational tournament

Personal
In 1986, she married Kenji Niinuma, a Japanese popular enka singer, and together they later had two children, a son and a daughter. In 2002, Yuki was inducted into the World Badminton Hall of Fame.

References

Japanese female badminton players
1948 births
2011 deaths
Badminton players at the 1972 Summer Olympics
Asian Games medalists in badminton
Badminton players at the 1970 Asian Games
Badminton players at the 1974 Asian Games
Badminton players at the 1978 Asian Games
Asian Games gold medalists for Japan
Asian Games bronze medalists for Japan
Medalists at the 1970 Asian Games
Medalists at the 1974 Asian Games
Medalists at the 1978 Asian Games